Muirhead is  a surname of Scottish origin, and may refer to:

 Aaron Muirhead (born 1990), Scottish footballer
 Alexander Muirhead (1848–1920), Scottish scientist
 Andy Muirhead (born 1975), Australian radio and television presenter
 Anthony Muirhead (1890–1939), British politician and soldier
 Arch Muirhead (1876–19??), Australian rules footballer
 Ben Muirhead (born 1983), English footballer
 Bill Muirhead (curler), Scottish curler
 Billie-May Muirhead, Scottish curler
 Bruce Muirhead, Canadian historian
 Charlie Muirhead, British internet entrepreneur
 Clara Winsome Muirhead (1916-1985), Scottish botanist
 Corey Muirhead (born 1983), Canadian basketball player
 David Muirhead (1918–1999), British diplomat
 Desmond Muirhead (1923-2002), English-born American golf course designer
 Doug Muirhead (born 1962), Canadian soccer player
 Eve Muirhead (born 1990), Scottish curler
 George Muirhead (disambiguation)
 Gerald Muirhead (born 1931), Canadian politician
 Glen Muirhead (born 1989), Scottish curler, brother of Eve and Thomas
 Gordon Muirhead, Scottish curler, father of Eve, Glen and Thomas 
 Herbert Muirhead (1850–1904), British soldier, who played for the Royal Engineers in the 1872 FA Cup Final
 James Muirhead (1925–1999), Australian judge
 James Muirhead (cricketer) (born 1993), Australian cricketer 
 James Patrick Muirhead (1813–1898), Scottish lawyer and author
 John Muirhead (1877–1954), Canadian politician
 John Henry Muirhead (1855–1940), British philosopher
 Lockhart Muirhead (1765–1829), Scottish librarian, museum-keeper and academic
 Lorna Muirhead, held the positions of President of the Royal College of Midwives, and Lord Lieutenant of Merseyside
 Oliver Muirhead (born 1957), English actor
 Robbie Muirhead (born 1996), Scottish footballer
 Robert Franklin Muirhead (1860–1941), Scottish mathematician
 Roland Muirhead (1868–1964), Scottish nationalist politician
 Scott Muirhead (born 1984), Scottish footballer
 Stanley Muirhead (1902–1942), American football player
 Suzie Muirhead (born 1975), New Zealand hockey player
 Thomas Muirhead (curler) (born 1995), Scottish curler, brother of Eve and Glen 
 Tommy Muirhead (1897–1979),  Scottish footballer
 William Muirhead, nineteenth-century Christian missionary in China
 William Muirhead (politician) (1819–1884), Canadian businessman and politician
 Gerard Muirhead-Gould (1889–1945), British Naval officer.

See also
 Morehead

Scottish surnames